The Atishbaz  are a Muslim community found in the state Uttar Pradesh in  India. They also refer to themselves as Atishbaz Shaikh or sometimes just Shaikh, which is also a common surname. The Uttar Pradesh Atishbaz have been granted Other Backward Class status. A small number are also found in the city of Karachi, Sindh Pakistan.

Origin

The word atishbaz literally means a firework maker, from the Persian atish meaning fire, and baz meaning to play, and the community is said to have acquired the name on account of their traditional occupation, which was the manufacture of fireworks. According to the traditions of the community, they were originally brought over by the Mughals from Central Asia, as their ancestors were specialists in the manufacture of gunpowder. With the decline of the Mughal Empire, the community took to the manufacturing of fireworks. They are found mainly in eastern Uttar Pradesh,  in the districts of Mirzapur, Azamgarh, Jaunpur, Basti, Gonda and Varanasi. In Varanasi, they are found in the Kashipura, Aurangabad and Ram Nagar localities. The Atishbaz speak Bhojpuri, although most educated Atishbaz also speak Urdu. A separate grouping of Atishbaz is found in Moradabad and Aligarh districts, where in the city of Aligarh, they occupy the neighbourhood of Atishbazan.  These Atishbaz speak Khari boli, as well as Urdu.

Present circumstances

Although the traditional occupation of the Atishbaz was the selling and manufacture of fireworks, the majority are now small to medium-sized farmers, while a larger number are agricultural labourers. In their urban settlements, such as those found in Varanasi, the majority are still involved in their traditional occupation. While the Moradabad and Aligarh Atishbaz are mainly petty businessmen, or involved in the manufacture of locks.

The community live in multi caste and multi religious settlements, but occupy their own distinct quarters. Each settlement has a caste council, known as a panchayat, which acts as an instrument of social control. It deals with intra community disputes, as well as punishing those who breach communal norms. Unlike other Muslim artisan castes in North India, the Atishbaz have not set a formal caste association. However, like other Muslim artisan groups, they are strictly endogamous, preferring to marry close kin. The community are Sunni Muslims, and have practices similar to other Uttar Pradesh Muslims.

See also

Muslims of Uttar Pradesh

References

Muslim communities of Uttar Pradesh
Shaikh clans
Muhajir communities